Giorgia Lupi is an Italian information designer, a partner at design firm Pentagram, and co-founder of research and design firm Accurat. She is a co-author of Dear Data, a collection of hand drawn data visualizations, along with information designer Stefanie Posavec. Her work is also part of the permanent collection at the Museum of Modern Art.

Early life and education
Lupi was born 1981 in Italy. When she was a little girl she would spend a significant amount of time collecting and organizing all kinds of items into folders: colored sheets of papers, tiny stones, pieces of textiles from her grandmothers buttons, sales receipts and so much more grew in her collection. She has said she took pleasure in organizing and categorizing her treasures based on their, sizes, color and dimensions. She has said that her childhood interest in numbers, cataloguing and classifying rules and systems explains the origin of her work and her desires to play with data. These interests have also included the scales of large cities and urban mapping projects, and representing information layers underlining an architecture project.

She graduated from FAF in Ferrara, Italy, where she studied architecture. Lupi has her masters in architecture, but has not built any houses during her schooling career. An architect's job is not to build buildings, but they design representations of buildings, images of building's following a system of symbols that convey information about how to manufacture them.  After graduating in 2006 She worked with two different interaction design firms in Italy, mostly working on interactive installations and mapping projects showing off difficult systems of knowledge. In 2011 she began her PhD in design at Milan Politecnico and started Accurat. In 2012 she moved to New York City where she lives now.

Career 
In 2011, Lupi co-founded research and design firm Accurat, that combines design and data to create data visualizations, interfaces, and tools. Among their clients are Google, IBM, Bill & Melinda Gates Foundation, Starbucks, United Nations, the World Economic Forum and the Museum of Modern Art. Lupi's influences for her work come from fascinations by geometrical feel and balance of abstract art compositions. Lupi's work has been influenced by data visualization and data art by Moritz Stefaner, Aaron Koblin and Jer Thorp. What drives Lupi in her career is the overlapping space between intuition and analysis, between beauty and logic, numbers and images.

In 2014 Lupi began the Dear Data Project with Stefanie Posavec. Every week for one year Lupi and Posavec exchanged a "data drawing", a hand drawn data visualization that represented a part of their daily life, through the mail. In 2016 these postcards were compiled and published in a book called Dear Data. The following year the Museum of Modern Art added the original Dear Data postcards to the Museum's collection.

In 2016, Giorgia Lupi published an article in Print Mag in which she introduced the concept of Data Humanism, which she further developed in her TED Talk. 

In 2019, Lupi joined Pentagram New York as a partner.

Awards 
 2022: National Design Award by Cooper Hewitt, Smithsonian Design Museum 
 2015: Information is Beautiful Awards - Gold Medal and Most Beautiful Project.
 2013: Information is Beautiful Awards - Gold Medal, category: Data Visualization.
 2013: Strata Conference - Data Journalism Award.
 2013: Cannes Festival - Bronze Lion, Direct Advertising.

References 

Data scientists
Italian designers
Living people
Year of birth missing (living people)
Pentagram partners (past and present)